"Baby I Like" is a song recorded by Japanese singer Mai-K. It was released on October 16, 1999 via East West Records and Bip! Records in the United States. The tracks were written by YOKO Black. Stone, who had recorded these three songs for her own albums. Commercially, the single couldn't perform well in the US music market.

Track listing

References

External links
Mai Kuraki Official Website

1999 singles
Mai Kuraki songs
1999 songs